Gerger may refer to:
Gerger, a district in Turkey
Garrgarr, Lori Province, Armenia
Herher, Vayots Dzor Province, Armenia
Gərgər, Azerbaijan
Qarqar, Azerbaijan
Gerger, Iran (disambiguation)